Lieutenant General Sir Charles Roland Vincent Walker,  (born 14 May 1970) is a senior British Army officer, serving as Deputy Chief of the Defence Staff (Military Strategy and Operations) since April 2021.

Early life and education
Walker was born on 14 May 1970 in Nairobi, Kenya, to Patrick and Daphne Walker. His mother later married Frederick Conyngham, 7th Marquess Conyngham. He was educated at the Dragon School, a private preparatory school in Oxford and at Harrow School, an all-boys independent boarding school in London. He studied at the Royal Agricultural College, graduating with a Bachelor of Science degree. He was sponsored through university by the British Army via a university cadetship.

Military service
Walker was commissioned in the Guards Division of the as a second lieutenant (on probation) on 9 September 1990 as part of his undergraduate cadetship. He began active service in the Irish Guards in 1993, and saw operational tours in Northern Ireland and Iraq. In 1997 he joined 22 Special Air Service Regiment. Following his time with special forces, he became commanding officer of the 1st Battalion, Grenadier Guards from 2008 to 2010. With the Grenadiers, he served a tour in Afghanistan, during which the Ridgeback PPV in which he was travelling in was blown up by an IED: all six soldiers inside escaped uninjured, but the vehicle was thrown into the air, had its wheels blown off and its armour shredded. Walker was awarded the Distinguished Service Order (DSO) in September 2010 in recognition of gallant and distinguished services in Afghanistan.

Walker commanded the 12th Armoured Infantry Brigade from 2013 to 2015, and was promoted to brigadier on 30 June 2014. He has since held staff appointments at Army Headquarters and the Ministry of Defence. In addition, he has served as Colonel Commandant of the Royal Army Veterinary Corps from 1 March 2017 to 1 June 2022, and Regimental Lieutenant Colonel of the Grenadier Guards from 18 June 2017 to 18 June 2022; both ceremonial appointments. He was promoted to major general on 8 March 2018, and appointed Director Special Forces. He was promoted to lieutenant general and became Deputy Chief of Defence Staff (Military Strategy and Operations) on 16 April 2021.

Walker was appointed Knight Commander of the Order of the Bath (KCB) in the 2023 New Year Honours.

Personal life
In 1998, Walker married Kate. Together they have three daughters and live in Herefordshire.

References

External links
The Grenadier Guards under the command of Walker preparing for Trooping the Colour

|-

1970 births
Living people
Irish Guards officers
Grenadier Guards officers
British Army generals
Knights Commander of the Order of the Bath
Companions of the Distinguished Service Order
People educated at The Dragon School
People educated at Harrow School
Alumni of the Royal Agricultural University